Navilgone is a village in Honavar taluk, India. Several famous Indians are natives of Navilgone. It's also the land of many Kalavidas(artists).The village is home to approximately 300 families.  The main way of life is agriculture. Major crops are arecanut, coconut, paddy and cashew nuts.

References

Villages in Uttara Kannada district